Proutiella ilaire is a moth of the family Notodontidae. It is found from Panama and Costa Rica to Colombia.

External links
Species page at Tree of Life project

Notodontidae of South America
Moths described in 1885